Stéphane Robert was the defending champion, but decided not to compete this year.
Jesse Huta Galung won in the final 6–7(4–7), 6–4, 6–4, against his compatriot, Thomas Schoorel.

Seeds

Draw

Finals

Top half

Bottom half

References
Main Draw
Qualifying Singles

TEAN International - Singles
TEAN International